St. Augustine's Catholic Church is a historic Gothic Revival-style Roman Catholic church building located on North Hanover Street in Minster, Ohio, United States.  Located in the region of western Ohio known as the "Land of the Cross-Tipped Churches," the church was built in 1848.  In 1874, the building was modified with the construction of twin Gothic spires designed by Anton Goehr.

Beginning in the middle of the nineteenth century, St. Augustine was one of the three mother churches for the Society of the Precious Blood that served the Catholics of the region; it kept this position until the end of the century, and it is the only one of the three yet remaining.  While many other churches in the region were built in the middle of the nineteenth century, few remain today, and only St. Augustine and St. John's to the northeast are yet used as parish churches.

On July 26, 1979, the building was added to the National Register of Historic Places as part of the "Cross-Tipped Churches of Ohio" multiple property submission.  Today, St. Augustine's and St. Joseph's Church in nearby Egypt constitute the Minster Cluster of the Archdiocese of Cincinnati.

Interior

The church interior is adorned with stained windows depicting Christ and saints.

Subjects of the pictorial windows
St. Augustine
St. Gaspar del Bufalo
St. John Bosco
St. John the Evangelist
St. Rose of Lima
Jesus as the Good Shepherd

The church ceiling is decorated with frescos depicting the life of Christ and a scene in Heaven.

Subjects of the ceiling frescos
The Trinity and the Communion of Saints
Adoration of the shepherds
The Annunciation
The Agony in the Garden
The Crucifixion of Jesus
The Entombment of Jesus
The Resurrection of Jesus

References

External links

 Minster Cluster website

Roman Catholic churches completed in 1848
19th-century Roman Catholic church buildings in the United States
Churches in Auglaize County, Ohio
National Register of Historic Places in Auglaize County, Ohio
Churches in the Land of the Cross-Tipped Churches
Gothic Revival church buildings in Ohio
Churches in the Roman Catholic Archdiocese of Cincinnati
Missionaries of the Precious Blood